Brianna Green (born 20 November 1996) is an Australian rules footballer playing for West Coast in the AFL Women's competition. Green was drafted by Fremantle with their second selection and thirteenth overall in the 2016 AFL Women's draft. She played the first two matches for the year before missing the remainder of the year due to a shoulder injury. She would not make it through to the following week's match however, sustaining a serious knee injury at training two days before round 2. Scans later confirmed she had sustained a season ending ruptured anterior cruciate ligament, which will also sideline Green for the 2019 AFLW season. Green was delisted by the Eagles on 9 June 2021, after playing 7 games with the team throughout her career.

References

External links 

1996 births
Living people
Fremantle Football Club (AFLW) players
Australian rules footballers from Western Australia

West Coast Eagles (AFLW) players